Abubakar dan Usman Subande (b. c.1762 – d. 1841) popularly known as Buba Yero was the founder and the first emir of Gombe and had held the title of Modibbo of Gombe. In 1804, Buba Yero founded Gombe emirate, he was a follower of the Fulani jihad leader Usman dan Fodio.

References 

Nigerian traditional rulers
People from Gombe State